Rygh is a Norwegian surname. Notable people with this surname include:

 Aase Texmon Rygh, (1925-2019) Norwegian sculptor
 Anne Rygh Pedersen (born 1967), Norwegian politician
 Evald Rygh (1842-1913), Norwegian politician
 Karl Ditlev Rygh (1839-1915), Norwegian politician
 Lauritz Kristian Nilssen Rygh (1874-1950), Norwegian politician
 Oluf Rygh (1833-1899), Norwegian archaeologist, philologist and historian
 Peder Strand Rygh (1800-1868), Norwegian politician